Kerre Woodham (born ), formerly known as Kerre McIvor, is a New Zealand journalist, radio presenter, author and columnist. At the end of 2017 she was named as the replacement for Andrew Dickens on Newstalk ZB Sunday mornings beginning in 2018 and Leighton Smith on mornings beginning in 2019.

Career 
Woodham studied journalism at Wellington Polytechnic. Her early career was in radio, working for Radio New Zealand for two years before moving into television, reporting for Video Dispatch. In 1986 Woodham began reporting for consumer affairs television programme Fair Go. After leaving the show in 1990 for a job as a breakfast radio host she then worked for TV3's Nightline. From 1994 to 1997 she appeared as a presenter on Heartland, which covered the New Zealand community. In 1998 she became the presenter for Ready, Steady, Cook which aired until 2005. Over the same period she was the presenter of a number of current affairs and topical items on New Zealand national television.

Woodham is also a columnist for the Herald on Sunday, a national newspaper.

In 2010, Woodham wrote her first book titled Short Fat Chick in Paris and followed it in 2011 with Short Fat Chick to Marathon Runner. Her third book, published in 2013 was Musings from Middle Age.

In 2016 she was presented with a Scroll of Honour from the Variety Artists Club of New Zealand for services to charity and New Zealand broadcasting.

Woodham was a contestant on the 2022 season of the dancing show Dancing with the Stars.

Personal life 
Woodham married Tom McIvor on 2 February 2013. Following the breakup of their marriage, she returned to using her maiden name.

References 

1960s births
Living people
New Zealand television presenters
Newstalk ZB
Year of birth missing (living people)